Geita is a genus of moths belonging to the family Tortricidae.

Species
Geita bjoernstadi Aarvik, 2004

See also
List of Tortricidae genera

References

External links
tortricidae.com

Olethreutini
Tortricidae genera